The enzyme 4-hydroxybenzoyl-CoA thioesterase (EC 3.1.2.23) catalyzes the reaction

4-hydroxybenzoyl-CoA + H2O  4-hydroxybenzoate + CoA

This enzyme belongs to the family of hydrolases, specifically those acting on thioester bonds. The systematic name is 4-hydroxybenzoyl-CoA hydrolase. This enzyme participates in 2,4-dichlorobenzoate degradation.

Structural studies

References

 
 

EC 3.1.2
Enzymes of known structure